Saccharomycopsis is a genus of fungi belonging to the family Saccharomycopsidaceae.

The genus has cosmopolitan distribution.

Species

Species:

Saccharomycopsis amapae 
Saccharomycopsis babjevae 
Saccharomycopsis capsularis

References

Saccharomycetes
Ascomycota genera